Cylloceria is a genus of parasitoid wasps belonging to the family Ichneumonidae.

The species of this genus are found in Europe and America.

Species:
 Cylloceria aino (Uchida, 1928) 
 Cylloceria alpigena (Strobl, 1902)

References

Ichneumonidae
Ichneumonidae genera